Box Hill Cemetery is a cemetery located in Melbourne's eastern suburb of Box Hill, Victoria in Australia. It currently occupies 12.5 ha (31 acres). It is known as the resting place of notable figures from Melbourne and its heritage-registered Columbarium and Myer Memorial. Around 50,000 decedents have been interred since the cemetery was gazetted and commenced operations in 1873. The original 10-acre site was extended in 1886 and again in 1935.

Architecture
The Myer memorial was designed by British architect Edwin Lutyens in association with local architects Yuncken, Freeman, Freeman & Griffiths. The columbarian, a brick building in the style of a Byzantine church was designed by architects Rodney Alsop and A. Bramwell Smith and constructed in 1929.

History of Box Hill Cemetery
The first moves to establish a public cemetery at Box Hill, east of Melbourne, were made in 1872 when an area of twelve acres was set aside and eight trustees were appointed at a public meeting. A grant of £35 was received from the Government of the day for the erection of a fence around the site. The area was part of a large reserve bounded on two sides by Whitehorse Road and Britnells Road (now Middleborough Road) from which the Sagoe Common School and police paddock had been excised.

The first burial took place the day after the cemetery was officially gazetted on 30 August 1873. Prior to this, burials took place on land surrounding the nearby United Methodist Church and in the small Lutheran cemetery established at Waldau (Doncaster) in 1860. Public cemeteries had also been established at Kew and Burwood.

Box Hill Cemetery was enlarged on two occasions in subsequent years. A small adjoining section, still referred to as the 'New Survey', was gazetted in 1886, following the extension of the railway line from Box Hill to Lilydale. In 1935 a further adjoining area of twelve acres was purchased by the Box Hill Council to bring the cemetery to its present size of ≈12.5 hectares (30.8 acres). Part of this area included the police paddock.

From 1875 until 1973, the main entrance to the cemetery was from Whitehorse Road by way of an attractive avenue. The fine entrance gates and pillars to this approach still stand today, but they are no longer part of the cemetery. The present entrance from Middleborough Road was established in 1973 to eliminate the need for funeral traffic to cross the railway line and the Whitehorse Road entrance avenue was passed over to the then City of Box Hill in 1979.

Two notable features within the cemetery are the large lych-gate or commemorative arch built in 1923 to mark the 50th anniversary of the cemetery; and the columbarium built in 1929 as a repository for cremated remains. Designed by architects Rodney Alsop and A. Bramwell Smith and built by T. F. Crabbe, this building is in the form of a Greek cross; it has a Spanish-tiled gable roof and octagonal tower with a copper dome. While the exterior appearance has a distinctive Mediterranean flavour, the proportions of the exterior are Byzantine. This building is now included on the register of Heritage Victoria.

Another interesting item is the large iron bell hanging over the entrance to the current office. Cast in Manchester, England in 1886, the bell originally served the Box Hill Fire Brigade at its previous Watts Street premises where it was used to call-out volunteer fire-fighters to emergencies over many years. In 1927, the Brigades Board presented the bell to the Box Hill Cemetery where it is rung each evening around 5:00 pm as a signal to cemetery visitors that the gates are soon to close.

With few remaining new burial sites available, the first stage of a community mausoleum was constructed in 2002 to provide 130 crypt spaces on five levels. Crypts are faced with shutters of imported granite and distinctive architectural features include wide verandahs on all sides supported by brick and rendered pillars in Californian Bungalow style. A second stage, offering a further 216 crypts on six levels was built in the same style in 2005. The first stage was designed by Brearley Architects and Urban Designers and the subsequent stage by GHD. Both buildings were constructed by Milne-Miller Constructions. The complex was officially opened by the Hon. Daniel Andrews (then Parliamentary Secretary to the Minister for Health) on 20 November 2005.

A third stage of the community mausoleum was also designed by GHD and built by Milne-Miller Constructions in 2012, to provide a further 270 crypt spaces.

A range of themed historical walking tours of the cemetery (visiting various famous graves) are periodically conducted by members of Box Hill Historical Society. For further information on these tours is available from the Box Hill Historical Society.

Records Search
Box Hill Cemetery record searches for genealogical or any other purpose may be conducted through the cemetery website www.boxhillcemetery.com.au at any time, by simply selecting the 'Find a Grave or Memorial' function. A map of the selected site and surrounding area may also be printed to help visitors find specific graves and memorials.

Notable Interments
 Dame Jacobena Angliss, philanthropist
 Sir William Angliss, businessman, politician and philanthropist
 Robert Beckett, politician
 Maurice Blackburn, politician and lawyer
 Edouard Borovansky, ballet dancer, choreographer and director
 Cyril P. Callister, inventor of Vegemite
 Sir Ian Clunies Ross, chairman of the CSIRO
 Sir George James Coles, owner of Coles Supermarkets
 C.J. Dennis, poet
 Joy Hester, artist
 Sir John Higgins, businessman and metallurgist
 Frank Hyett, politician
 Nellie Constance Martyn, businesswoman
 Sir George McBeath, businessman
 James Whiteside McCay, general and politician
 James Menzies, politician, father of Sir Robert Menzies
 Ken Myer, businessman and philanthropist
 Dame Merlyn Myer, philanthropist
 Sidney Myer, businessman and philanthropist, founder of Myer
 Frank O'Connor, Secretary of the Department of Supply in the 1950s
 Samuel Pethebridge, politician and soldier, Secretary of Australian Department of Defence in World War I
 Lillian Pyke, children's author and novelist
 Harold Crofton Sleigh, merchant and ship-owner
 Jane Sutherland, artist
 George Tallis, theatrical entrepreneur

War Graves
The cemetery contains the war graves of 67 Commonwealth service personnel. There are 16 from World War I, highest ranking being Brigadier-General Sir Samuel Pethebridge, who died in January 1918, and 51 from World War II.

Box Hill Cemetery Trust
Box Hill Cemetery is governed by a dedicated Trust, which has continued since 1873. The Trust is a statutory board, responsible to the Government of Victoria for strategic oversight and on-going stewardship of the cemetery. Trust-members are appointed under the Victorian Cemeteries and Crematoria Act 2003, by the Governor in Council on recommendation of the State Minister for Health.

Gallery

References

External links
 Box Hill Cemetery – Billion Graves
 

1873 establishments in Australia
Cemeteries in Melbourne
Heritage sites in Melbourne
 
Buildings and structures in the City of Whitehorse